Mina Harigae (born November 1, 1989) is an American professional golfer currently playing on the LPGA Tour.

As an amateur golfer, she won the 2007 U.S. Women's Amateur Public Links. Harigae won the California Women's Amateur Championship for four consecutive years (2001–2005); her first victory came as a 12-year-old.

Childhood and family life
Born to Japanese parents, Harigae attended the Stevenson School. Her parents run a sushi restaurant in Pacific Grove, California called Takara Sushi.
She attended Duke University, leaving after a year to pursue a professional golf career.

Amateur career
 Won the 2007 U.S. Women's Amateur Public Links
 Reached the Semifinals at the 2003 and 2006 U.S. Girls' Junior. Was the stroke-play medalist at the 2006 U.S. Girls' Junior.
 Reached third round of the U.S. Women's Amateur in 2004 and 2006; advanced to the first round of match play at the 2008.
 Four-time winner of the California Women's Amateur Championship (2001–2004).
 Member of the U.S. Junior Ryder Cup team in 2004 and Junior Solheim Cup team in 2007.
 Member of the 2008 U.S. Curtis Cup Team.
 Three-time Rolex AJGA Junior All-American First Team selection.

Professional career
In 2009, Harigae played on the Futures Tour, the LPGA Tour's developmental tour. She won three tournaments and was the tour's leading money winner, which earned her membership on the LPGA Tour for the 2010 season. She won her largest payday, $1,080,000 for a second place finish at the U.S. Women's Open on June 5, 2022, losing by 4 strokes to Minjee Lee. Lee won the largest purse to date in women's history $1.8 million in that tournament's largest prize total ever, $10 million.

Professional wins (7)

Futures Tour wins (3) 
2009 (3) Ladies Titan Tire Challenge, Michelob Ultra Duramed Futures Players Championship, Falls Auto Group Classic

Cactus Tour wins (4)
2020 (4) Longbow Golf Club, Desert Canyon Golf Club, Orange Tree, Talking Stick North Course

Results in LPGA majors
Results not in chronological order before 2019 or in 2020.

^ The Evian Championship was added as a major in 2013.

CUT = missed the half-way cut
NT = no tournament
"T" = tied

Summary

Most consecutive cuts made – 8 (2013 Evian – 2015 WPGA)
Longest streak of top-10s – 1

LPGA Tour career summary

^ Official as of 2022 season

*Includes matchplay and other tournaments without a cut.

Futures Tour career summary

World ranking
Position in Women's World Golf Rankings at the end of each calendar year.

Team appearances
Amateur
Junior Ryder Cup (representing the United States): 2004
Junior Solheim Cup (representing the United States): 2007
Curtis Cup (representing the United States): 2008 (winners)

Professional
Solheim Cup (representing the United States): 2021

Solheim Cup record

References

External links

American female golfers
Duke Blue Devils women's golfers
LPGA Tour golfers
Golfers from California
Golfers from Arizona
American sportspeople of Japanese descent
Sportspeople from Monterey, California
Sportspeople from Mesa, Arizona
1989 births
Living people